Depo Station is a railway station serving the neighbourhood of Zasulauks in the district of Kurzeme in Riga, Latvia. The station is located on the Torņakalns – Tukums II Railway which connects Riga with Tukums. It's the location of Zasulauka depo (a motive power depot), which gave the station the name.

References

External links

Railway stations in Riga
Railway stations opened in 1960